The Rocky statue in Žitište in Žitište, Serbia is one of the town's most iconic images. Located in town's center the statue of Rocky Balboa by Croatian artist Boris Staparac, it was erected in 2007. Canadian director Barry Avrich made a documentary film Amerika Idol which depicts the events that preceded the creation of the statue, as well as the ceremony of its installation. The film also features Sylvester Stallone who portrayed the character of Rocky in eight films and A. Thomas Schomberg who made the famous Rocky statue in Philadelphia.

In 2011 the Lonely Planet guide included the monument to Rocky Balboa in Žitište, in its list of the "top 10 most bizarre monuments on Earth", along with Equestrian statue of the Duke of Wellington, Glasgow and the Washington National Cathedral in the United States.

See also
 Rocky Steps

References

External links

Statue
Žitište
Boxing in art
Sculptures of sports
Statues of fictional characters
Portraits of actors
Cultural depictions of Sylvester Stallone